Haathkadi may refer to:
 Haathkadi (1995 film), a 1995 Bollywood action film 
 Haathkadi (1982 film), a 1982 Hindi-language Indian film
 Hathkadi (1958 film), a 1958 Bollywood film